Dallinger von Dalling is a surname. Notable people with the surname include:

 Johann Dallinger von Dalling (1741–1806), Austrian painter
 Johann Baptist Dallinger von Dalling (1782–1868), his son, also an Austrian painter
 Alexander Johann Dallinger von Dalling (1783–1844), his second son, also an Austrian painter